IPS Diaries is a crime based show airing on Doordarshan since October 2015. It is anchored by actress Kavita Chaudhary, shown as a retired cop in the series. It features true crime stories, which are televised for the audience.

References 

DD National original programming
2015 Indian television series debuts
Fictional portrayals of police departments in India